Bui Tuan Dung (born 1972) is a director working in Vietnam Feature Film Studio (Vietnam Feature Film Studio). He is one of the most successful directors in the beginning of 21st century with both genres: feature film and TV series. With the strength of topic related to war had careful selection from audience and investors, Bui Tuan Dung still has his own image and can prove his talent without using PR tools.
Not only a skillful director, Bui Tuan Dung is thought as the one having a wide range of knowledge and knowing very well about the fields his films are in. Thus, details in his movie are very solid and persuasive. He was a judge in the National Film Festival period, and is known for being part of the faculty of the International Film School in Saigon.

Filmography 
 Duong thu (film) (2004)
 Hanoi Hanoi (film) (2005)
 The Dance Of Death (2006)
 The Legend Makers (film)  (2013)
 Ho Chi Minh in Siam (2015)

Television series
 Linh Lan Trang (2007)
 Nhiem vu dac biet (2009)
 Di qua ngay bien dong (2010)
 Vong tron cam bay (2010)
 Road to Dien Biên (TV Series) (2015)
 Hoa dai trang

Awards 
 Golden Kite for Best Feature Film 2006 for “Hanoi, Hanoi”
 Golden Kite for Best Director2006 for “The Wedding In Heaven”.
 Golden Lotus for Best Feature Film - The 15th Vietnam National Film Festival 2007 for “Hanoi, Hanoi”
 Best Audience Choice Feature Film - The 15th Vietnam National Film Festival 2007 for “Hanoi, Hanoi”
 Best Jury Choice Feature Film - The 15th Vietnam National Film Festival 2007 for “The Dance Of Death”.
 Golden Bell for Best Advertising TVC 2007 for TVC “Wedding”
 Awards Golden Lotus for Best Feature Film - The 18th Vietnam Film Festival 2013 for “The Legend Makers (film)”
 A– Ho Chi Minh Award 2015 for “Ho Chi Minh in Siam”

References

External links 
 
 Đạo diễn Bùi Tuấn Dũng, dịu dàng sau gai góc.
 Đạo diễn Bùi Tuấn Dũng tấn công lĩnh vực phim truyền hình.
  Bùi Tuấn Dũng, là người yêu thì không là diễn viên

1975 births
Living people
Male actors of Vietnamese descent
Vietnamese film directors